Uralophantes is a monotypic genus of European sheet weavers containing the single species, Uralophantes troitskensis. It was first described by S. L. Esyunin in 1992, and is only found in Europe.

See also
 List of Linyphiidae species (Q–Z)

References

Linyphiidae
Monotypic Araneomorphae genera
Spiders of Russia